Memecylon dasyanthum is a species of plant in the family Melastomataceae. It is endemic to Cameroon.  Its natural habitat is subtropical or tropical moist montane forests. It is threatened by habitat loss.

References

Endemic flora of Cameroon
dasyanthum
Vulnerable plants
Taxonomy articles created by Polbot